Silko was ruler of the Nubian kingdom of Nobatia. He is known for being the first Nubian king to adopt Christianity

During Silko's reign Nobatia successfully defeated the Blemmyes to the North, and an inscription by Silko at  the Temple of Kalabsha claims to have driven the Blemmyes into the Eastern Desert. The inscription on the temple was made in Greek suggesting that he was influenced by Byzantine culture. He established Pakhoras (modern Faras) as the Capital of the Kingdom. Nobatia officially converted to Coptic Orthodox Christianity under his reign.

References

6th-century monarchs in Africa
History of Nubia
History of Sudan